8th CDG Awards
February 26, 2006

Contemporary: 
 Transamerica 

Fantasy: 
 The Chronicles of Narnia: The Lion, the Witch and the Wardrobe 

Period: 
 Memoirs of a Geisha 
The 8th Costume Designers Guild Awards, given on February 26, 2006, honored the best costume designs in film and television for 2005. Winners highlighted in bold.

Winners and nominees

Film
 Contemporary Film:
  Danny Glicker – Transamerica
 Paul Simmons – Hustle & Flow
 Michael Kaplan – Mr. & Mrs. Smith
 Nancy Steiner – Shopgirl
 Louise Frogley – Syriana

 Fantasy Film:
  Isis Mussenden – The Chronicles of Narnia: The Lion, the Witch and the Wardrobe
 Lindy Hemming – Batman Begins
 Gabriella Pescucci – Charlie and the Chocolate Factory
 Trisha Biggar – Star Wars: Episode III – Revenge of the Sith

 Period Film:
  Colleen Atwood – Memoirs of a Geisha
 Kasia Walicka-Maimone – Capote
 Louise Frogley – Good Night, and Good Luck.
 Aggie Guerard Rodgers – Rent
 Arianne Phillips – Walk the Line

Television
 Contemporary Series:
  Six Feet Under - Jill M. Ohanneson
 Alias - Laura Goldsmith
 Arrested Development - Katie Sparks
 Desperate Housewives - Catherine Adair
 Nip/Tuck - Lou Eyrich

 Fantasy or Period Series:
  Rome - April Ferry 
 Carnivàle - Chrisi Karvonides-Dushenko
 Cold Case - Patia Prouty
 Deadwood - Katherine Jane Bryant
 That '70s Show - Melina Root

 Miniseries or Television Film:
  Elvis - Eduardo Castro 
 Empire Falls - Donna Zakowska
 Lackawanna Blues - Hope Hanafin
 Their Eyes Were Watching God - Eduardo Castro
 Warm Springs - Hope Hanafin

External links
 Costume Designers Guild 8th Annual Awards

Costume Designers Guild Awards
2005 film awards
2005 television awards
2005 guild awards
2005 in fashion
2006 in American cinema
2006 in American television